MMB-CHMICA (AMB-CHMICA) is a designer drug and synthetic cannabinoid.  In 2018, it was the sixth-most common synthetic cannabinoid identified in drugs seized by the Drug Enforcement Administration.

References 

Indolecarboxamides
Cannabinoids
Cyclohexyl compounds
Methyl esters
Carboxylate esters